is a Shinto shrine in the Kibitsu neighborhood of Kita-ku, Okayama in Okayama Prefecture, Japan. It is the ichinomiya of former Bitchū Province. The main festivals of the shrine is held annually on the second Sunday of May and on October 15.

Overview
The Kibitsu Jinja is located in the western part of Okayama city, facing north at the northwestern foot of Mount Kibi-Nakayama (elevation 175 meters) on the border between former Bizen Province and Bitchū Province. The mountain has been worshipped as a sacred mountain from ancient times, and both the Kibitsu Jinja and Kibitsuhiko Jinja are located at its northeastern foot. Kibitsu Jinja was originally the general guardian of Kibi Province, but due to the division of Kibi Province into three provinces, it became the ichinomiya of Bitchū, and bunrei from this shrine created the ichinomiya of Bizen Province (Kibitsuhiko Jinja) and Bingo Province (Kibitsu Shrine).

The Honden-Haiden, which was re-built by Ashikaga Yoshimitsu, is a National Treasure and the sole exemplar of the kibitsu-zukuri style of architecture, although the Soshidō of Hokekyō-ji is now believed to have been modeled thereon. In addition, the three shrine buildings are designated as National Important Cultural Properties, and a special Shinto ritual "Narukama Shinto" is famous.

Enshrined kami
The kami enshrined at Kibitsu Jinja are:
 , the son of Emperor Kōrei and conqueror of the Kingdom of Kibi
 , descendant of Kibitsuhiko
 {{nihongo|'Nakatsuhiko-no-mikoto| 仲彦命|}}, descendant of Kibitsuhiko
 , elder sister of Kibitsuhiko
 , elder sister of Kibitsuhiko
 , elder brother of Kibitsuhiko
 , brother of Kibitsuhiko
 , brother of Kibitsuhiko
 , brother of Kibitsuhiko

History
The origins of Kibitsu Jinja are uncertain. According to the shrine's legend, it is located at the site of Kibitsuhiko-no-Mikoto's residence, where he died at the age of 281, and was buried on the summit of the mountain. Afterwards, the residence was turned into a shrine, possibly by his fifth generation descendent Narumi Kaya, or by Emperor Nintoku, who visited Kibi Province where he built several shrines to commemorated Kibitsuhiko. However, the shrine does not appear in any historical documentation until the late Heian period, until entry in the Shoku Nihon Kōki dated 847 and the Nihon Montoku Tennō Jitsuroku dated 852. From the Kamakura through the Sengoku period, was revered by the samurai, and there were frequent restorations of the shrine and donations of territory.

The shrine is a ten-minute walk from Kibitsu Station on the JR West Kibi Line.

Cultural Properties
National TreasuresHonden and Haiden, Muromachi Period, built in 1390 and relocated their present locations in 1425.The main shrine has a Kibitsu-zukuri'' style roof, which consists of two Irimoya-zukuri roof are lined up in front and behind. The  influence of Buddhist architecture can be seen in many details of the structure.

Important Cultural Properties
, Muromachi Period, built in 1357.
, Sengoku Period, built in 1543.
, Edo Period, built in 1612.
, one pair, late Kamakura to Nanboku-cho period, Located to the east and west of the Honden.

Gallery

See also
List of National Treasures of Japan (shrines)
Ichinomiya
Hokekyō-ji (Ichikawa)

References

External links

Official home page
Okayama prefecture Official Tourism Guide

Shinto shrines in Okayama Prefecture
Bitchū Province
Okayama
Ichinomiya
National Treasures of Japan
Beppyo shrines